Lobelia trigonocaulis, the forest lobelia is a creeping or trailing herb, found in moist forest areas in New South Wales and Queensland in Australia. Blue to mauve flowers form between the months of December and May.

References

External links
 
 
 View a map of recorded sightings of Lobelia trigonocaulis at the Australasian Virtual Herbarium
 See images of Lobelia trigonocaulis on Flickriver

trigonocaulis
Flora of New South Wales
Flora of Queensland
Plants described in 1858